Earl is an unincorporated community in Johnston County, Oklahoma, United States. A post office operated in Earl from 1893 to 1908.

Demographics

References

Unincorporated communities in Johnston County, Oklahoma
Unincorporated communities in Oklahoma